Is Zat So? is a lost 1927 American silent comedy film directed by Alfred E. Green and starring George O'Brien, Edmund Lowe and Douglas Fairbanks Jr. It was produced and distributed by the Fox Film Corporation.

The film was based on a 1925 play of the same by James Gleason and Richard Taber and produced by George Brinton McLellan which ran for 634 performances at the 39th Street Theatre in New York and opened in the same year at the Adelphi Theatre The play starred Gleason, Sidney Riggs and a pre-talkies Robert Armstrong.

Plot

Cast
George O'Brien as Ed 'Chick' Cowan
Edmund Lowe as Hap Hurley
Katherine Perry as Marie Mestretti
Cyril Chadwick as Robert Parker
Doris Lloyd as Sue Parker
Diane Ellis as Florence Hanley 
Richard Maitland as Major Fitz Stanley
Douglas Fairbanks Jr. as G. Clifton Blackburn
Philippe De Lacy as Little Jimmy Parker
Jack Herrick as Gas House Duffy

See also
1937 Fox vault fire

References

External links

1927 films
Lost American films
Films directed by Alfred E. Green
Fox Film films
American films based on plays
American silent feature films
American black-and-white films
1920s American films